Liga Deportiva Universitaria de Quito's 1996 season was the club's 66th year of existence, the 43rd year in professional football, and the 36th in the top level of professional football in Ecuador.

Kits
Supplier: MarathonSponsor(s): Cerveza Club

Squad

Competitions

Serie A

First stage

Results

Second stage

Group 1

Results

Liguilla del No Descenso

Results

External links

RSSSF - 1996 Serie A 

1996